Varzuga may refer to:
Varzuga (river), a river in Murmansk Oblast, Russia
Varzuga (rural locality), a rural locality (a selo) in Murmansk Oblast, Russia
MT Varzuga, a Russian product tanker